First Bank of Nigeria Limited is a Nigerian multinational bank and financial services company in Lagos, Nigeria. It is the premier bank in West Africa. The First Bank of Nigeria Limited operates as a parent company, with the subsidiaries 'FBN Bank' in the Republic of Congo, Ghana, The Gambia, Guinea, Sierra-Leone and Senegal; FBN Bank UK Limited in the United Kingdom with a branch in Paris; First Bank Representative Office in Beijing to capture trade-related business between geographies. First Bank also operates First Pension Custodian Nigeria Limited, Nigeria's foremost pension custodian. The customers of the First Bank Group are serviced from a network of over 700 business locations across Africa. To promote financial inclusion and reach the unbanked, First Bank has an extensive Agent Banking network, with over 53,000 locations across Nigeria. 
The Bank specializes in retail banking and has the largest client base in West Africa, with over 18 million customers. For eight consecutive years (2011 - 2018) First Bank Nigeria received the Best Retail Bank in Nigeria award by The Asian Banker.

First Bank as a Group employs over 16,000 staff, and owns multiple 'Best Place to Work awardee'. It operates four key Strategic Business Units (SBUs) – Retail Banking, Corporate Banking, Commercial Banking, and Public Sector Banking. It was previously structured as an operating holding company before the implementation of a non-operating Holding Company structure (FBN Holdings) in 2011/2012.

For the half year ending June 30, 2022 FBN Holdings reported that its profit before tax rose by 45 percent, compared to the same period a year earlier.

Overview
, the Bank had assets worth NGN5.9 trillion. The Bank's profit before tax for the twelve months ending 31 December 2019 was approximately NGN70.8billion. First Bank is owned by FBN Holdings PLC, which in itself has diversified ownership, with over 1.3 million shareholders. The bank was founded in 1894 and is Nigeria's oldest bank. It converted to a public company in 1970 and was listed on The Nigerian Stock Exchange (NSE) in 1971. However, as part of the implementation of the non-operating holding company structure, it was delisted from the NSE and replaced with FBN Holdings Plc. in 2012.

First Bank has been named "Best Bank Brand in Nigeria" for six years in a row – 2011 to 2016 – by The Banker magazine of the Financial Times Group; it was awarded "Most Innovative Bank in Africa" in the EMEA Finance African Banking Awards 2014; it has clinched the “Best Bank in Nigeria” award by Global Finance Magazine 15 times and the “Best Private Bank in Nigeria” by World Finance Magazine seven times. Some other recent awards received by the Bank are “Best Banking Brand Nigeria, 2019” by Global Brands Magazine; “Best Mobile Banking App – Nigeria, 2019” by Global Business Outlook and “Best Financial Inclusion Program – Nigeria, 2019 by International Investor.

Subsidiaries
The subsidiaries of First Bank of Nigeria include the following:

 FBN Bank (DRC) Formerly Banque International de Credit (BIC) – Kinshasa, Democratic Republic of the Congo  – (75% shareholding) is a subsidiary of First Bank of Nigeria Limited, and was until September 2014 called BIC which was founded in April 1994
 FBN Bank (China) – Beijing, China  – representative office
 FBN Bank (Ghana) – Accra, Ghana  – 100% shareholding
 FBN Bank (Guinea) – Conakry, Guinea  – 100% shareholding
 FBN Bank (Senegal) – Dakar  – 100% shareholding
 FBN Bank (Sierra Leone) – Freetown, Sierra Leone  – 100% shareholding
 FBN Bank (South Africa) – Johannesburg, South Africa  – representative office
 FBN Bank (UAE) – Abu Dhabi, United Arab Emirates  – representative office
 FBN Bank (UK) – London, United Kingdom  – 100% shareholding – savings products sold under FirstSave brand
 FBN Bank (UK/Paris) – Paris, France  – a branch of the subsidiary in the UK
 First Pension Custodian Limited
 FBN Mortgages Limited
FBN Bank (Gambia)

FBN Holdings

In 2010, the Central Bank of Nigeria revised the regulation covering the scope of banking activities for Nigerian banks. The universal banking model was discontinued and banks were required to divest from non-core banking businesses or adopt a holding company structure. FirstBank opted to form a holding company, FBN Holdings Plc., to capture synergies across its already established banking and non-banking businesses. The new structure resulted in a stronger platform to support the group's future growth ambitions domestically and internationally.

 FBN Quest – FBN Quest is the brand name of the Merchant Banking and Asset Management businesses of FBN Holdings Plc, which comprises FBNQuest Merchant Bank, FBN Quest Capital Limited, FBN Quest Securities Limited, FBN Quest Capital Asset Management Limited, FBN Quest Trustees Limited, FBN Quest Funds Limited and FBN Capital Partners Limited.

History

Pre-independence
FirstBank commenced business in 1894  in what was then the British controlled areas, as the Bank of British West Africa. The bank originally served British shipping and trading agencies in Nigeria. The founder, Alfred Lewis Jones, was a shipping magnate who originally had a monopoly on importing silver currency into West Africa through his Elder Dempster shipping company. According to its founder, without a bank economies were reduced to using barter and a wide variety of mediums of exchange, leading to unsound practices. A bank could provide a secure home for deposits and also a uniform medium of exchange. The bank primarily financed foreign trade, but did little lending to indigenous Nigerians, who had little to offer as collateral for loans.

Post-independence
After Nigeria's independence in 1960, the Bank began to extend more credit to indigenous Nigerians. At the same time, citizens began to trust British banks since there was an 'independent' financial control mechanism and more citizens began to patronize the new Bank of West Africa.

In 1965, Standard Bank acquired the Bank of West Africa and changed its acquisition's name to Standard Bank of West Africa. In 1969, Standard Bank of West Africa incorporated its Nigerian operations under the name Standard Bank of Nigeria. In 1971, Standard Bank of Nigeria listed its shares on the Nigerian Stock Exchange and placed 13% of its share capital with Nigerian investors. After the end of the Nigerian civil war, Nigeria's military government sought to increase local control of the retail-banking sector. In response, now Standard Chartered Bank reduced its stake in Standard Bank Nigeria to 38%. Once it had lost majority control, Standard Chartered wished to signal that it was no longer responsible for the bank and the bank changed its name to First Bank of Nigeria Limited in 1979. By then, the bank had re-organized and had more Nigerian directors than ever.

In 1991 the Bank changed its name to First Bank of Nigeria Plc following listing on The Nigerian Stock Exchange. In 2012, the Bank changed its name again to First Bank of Nigeria Limited as part of a restructuring resulting in FBN Holdings Plc ("FBN Holdings"), having detached its commercial business from other businesses in the First Bank Group, in line with the requirements of the Central Bank of Nigeria. First Bank had 1.3 million shareholders globally, was quoted on The Nigerian Stock Exchange (NSE), where it was one of the most capitalized companies and also had an unlisted Global Depository maga communication Receipt (GDR) programme, all of which were transferred to its Holding Company, FBN Holdings in December 2012.

In 1982 FirstBank opened a branch in London, which it converted into a subsidiary, FBN Bank (UK), in 2002. Its most recent international expansion was the opening in 2004 of a representative office in Johannesburg, South Africa. In 2005 it acquired FBN (Merchant Bankers) Ltd. Paribas and MBC International Bank Ltd, a group of Nigerian investors, had founded MBC in 1982 as a merchant bank, and it became a commercial bank in 2002.

In June 2009, Stephen Olabisi Onasanya was appointed group managing director/chief executive officer, replacing Sanusi Lamido Sanusi, who had been appointed governor of the Central Bank of Nigeria. Onasanya was formerly executive director of banking operations & services. He retired on 31 December 2015 and Adesola Adeduntan took over as managing director/chief executive officer, First Bank of Nigeria Ltd and subsidiaries effective 1 January 2016, with Gbenga Shobo as deputy managing director.

In April 2021, the Central Bank of Nigeria fired the whole board of the First Bank of Nigeria which was in a «grave financial condition».

Key milestones
1894 – Incorporated and headquartered in Marina, Lagos, Nigeria, West Africa's commercial nerve centre.
1912 – Calabar branch, the second branch in Nigeria, was opened by King Jaja of Opobo; Zaria branch was also opened as the first branch in northern Nigeria.
1947 – FirstBank advanced the first long-term loan to the then colonial government, followed in 1955 by a partnership with the government to expand the railway lines.
1971 – First listing on the Nigerian Stock Exchange (NSE).
1991 – First Automated Teller Machine (ATM) introduced at 35 Marina as part of convenient, online real time banking.
1994 – Launched first university endowment programme in Nigeria.
2002 – Established FBN UK regulated by the FSA, the first Nigerian Bank to wholly own a full-fledged bank in the UK.
2004 – Launched a new brand identity which introduced substantial changes in the look and feel of the FirstBank brand.
2007 – Introduced Finnone credit administration software as the first bank in Africa to pioneer the service.
2011 – Launched the first biometric ATM and cash deposit ATM in Nigeria.
2012 – Became a subsidiary group of FBN Holdings Plc.
2013 – Completed the acquisition of ICB asset in Guinea, Gambia, Sierra Leone and Ghana as part of an ongoing Pan African expansion program.
2014 – Initiated, at 120 years, the launch of a new corporate identity.
2016 – Launched FirstLounge, the first landside lounge at Murtala Muhammed International Airport.

Leadership 
 Chairman – Tunde Hassan-Odukale
 Managing Director/CEO – Adesola  Kazeem Adeduntan
 Deputy Managing Director – Olugbenga Francis Shobo
 Executive Director, Public Sector Group – Abdullahi Ibrahim
 Executive Director, Corporate Banking – Oluwatosin Adewuyi
 Executive Director – Patrick Iyamabo.

See also

 List of banks in Nigeria
 Economy of Nigeria
 International Commercial Bank

References

External links

Companies listed on the Nigerian Stock Exchange
Banks of Nigeria
Banks established in 1894
Multinational companies based in Lagos
1894 establishments in the British Empire